When I See the Sun Always Shines on TV is an album of cover songs by drone doom band Nadja, released in April 2009. It was released under The End Records.

Track listing

Personnel
Aidan Baker - guitar, drums, vocals,
Leah Buckareff - bass, vocals

References

2009 albums
Covers albums
Nadja (band) albums